Duggunta is a small village or hamlet (Panchayath) in Podalakur Mandal in Spsr Nellore District of Andhra Pradesh State, India. It comes under Duggunta Panchayath.

References

Villages in Nellore district